There are at least 15 members of the bellflower order, Campanulales, found in the state of Montana in the United States. They include some introduced species and some designated as species of concern.

The bellflowers of Montana are all in the family Campanulaceae:

Campanula glomerata, clustered bellflower
Campanula medium, Canterbury bells
Campanula parryi, Parry's northern harebell
Campanula rapunculoides, creeping bellflower
Campanula rotundifolia, American harebell
Campanula scabrella, rough harebell
Campanula uniflora, arctic harebell
Downingia laeta, Great Basin downingia
Githopsis specularioides, common blue-cup
Heterocodon rariflorum, western pearlflower
Howellia aquatilis, water howellia
Lobelia kalmii, Kalm's lobelia
Lobelia spicata, pale-spiked lobelia
Triodanis leptocarpa, slim-pod Venus'-looking-glass
Triodanis perfoliata, claspingleaf Venus'-looking-glass

Further reading

See also
 List of dicotyledons of Montana

Notes

Bellflower